Clemmonsville Township is one of fifteen townships in Forsyth County, North Carolina, United States. The township had a population of 14,927 according to the 2010 census.

Geographically, Clemmonsville Township occupies  in southwestern Forsyth County.  The only incorporated municipality in Clemmonsville Township is the village of Clemmons.  The township fronts the Yadkin River on its western boundary.

References

Townships in Forsyth County, North Carolina
Townships in North Carolina